Jean Nichol (stage name of Louis Simoneau) (8 December 1944 – 11 May 2020) was a Canadian singer and songwriter.

Biography
Nichol performed with the group Les Commandeurs from 1962 to 1966. He also sang in bars under the name Maxime. He was discovered by Guy Cloutier, who became his manager and helped him adopt the name Jean Nichol. He experienced success in 1970 with the song "Oh Lady Mary", and he subsequently participated in the Musicorama tour. He often recorded French language versions of the songs of Tom Jones. He would perform at the Place des Arts in Montreal and the Grand Théâtre de Québec in Quebec City. He continued recording into the 1980s, with a little less success.

Discography
Jean Nichol sur scène (1970)
Oh Lady Mary (1970)
Sans toi (1971)
Jean Nichol (1971)
Pour vous (1973)
Angélique (1974)
Cette femme (1976)
Disons-nous adieu (1978)
16 grands succès (1998)
24 chansons d'amour (1999)

References

1944 births
2020 deaths
Canadian singer-songwriters
People from Windsor, Quebec
Singers from Quebec